Harkat-ul-Jihad-al-Islami Bangladesh, [] is the Bangladeshi branch of the terrorist group Harkat-ul-Jihad-al-Islami (HuJI). It is banned in Bangladesh and is a Proscribed Organisation in the United Kingdom under the Terrorism Act 2000. 

HuJI also played an instrumental role in the founding of the Indian Mujahideen terrorist group and had been involved with its earlier incarnation, Asif Reza Commando Force.

Leadership
The founder of the group was Maulana Abdus Salam. Other well known leaders include Shaikhul Hadith Allama and Azizul Haque, who was the chairman of the political party Islami Oikya Jote. Muhammad Habibur Rahman (alias Bulbuli Huzur) was a leader of the HuJI and initially a leader of Bangladesh Khelafat Majlish. The principal of Lalkhan Madrasa in Chittagong, Mufti Izharul Islam Chowdhury, was also a leader of the HuJI.

Mufti Abdul Hannan is the current leader of the Bangladeshi branch of the HuJI. He is currently incarcerated, convicted of various terrorism charges and has been sentenced to death. He is charged in 25 criminal cases involving terrorism.

History
Harkat-ul-Jihad-al-Islam (HuJI) was founded in 1984 during the Soviet–Afghan War. HuJI Bangladesh was founded on 30 April 1992 in the Bangladesh National Press Club by Bangladeshi mujahideen veterans of the Soviet–Afghan War. The founder of the group was Maulana Abdus Salam.

Since its founding, the group has been responsible for the deaths of over 100 people in various terrorist attacks. The group has been known to support the Rohingya insurgency in Western Myanmar. It allegedly has ties with the Rohingya Solidarity Organisation (RSO) and the Arakan Rohingya National Organisation (ARNO).

List of attacks
 On 18 January 1999, the group attempted to assassinate poet Shamsur Rahman.
 On 6 March 1999, the group carried out a bombing on the Udichi society in Jessore.
 On 8 October 1999, the group carried out a bombing on the Ahmadiyya mosque in Khulna.
 On 20 July 2000, the group attempted to assassinate the Prime Minister of Bangladesh, Sheikh Hasina.
 On 20 January 2001, the group bombed a communist party rally in Dhaka.
 On 14 April 2001, the group carried out a bombing on Bengali New Year celebrations in Ramna Park.
 On 3 June 2001, the group bombed a church service in Gopalganj.
 On 16 June 2001, the group bombed the Bangladesh Awami League office in Narayanganj.
 On 23 September 2001, the group bombed a rally held by the Bangladesh Awami League in Bagerhat.
 On 21 May 2004, the group bombed the Shah Jalal Shrine in Sylhet, targeting the British High Commissioner in Sylhet.
 On 21 June 2004, the group bombed a rally by Suranjit Sengupta in Sunamganj.
 On 7 August 2004, the group attacked a rally held by the Bangladesh Awami League in Sylhet.
 On 24 August 2004, the group attacked a rally held by the Bangladesh Awammi League in Dhaka, led by Shiekh Hasina.
 On 27 January 2005, the group attacked a rally held by the Bangladesh Awami League, led by Shah A M S Kibria.

References

Islamism in Bangladesh
Organizations based in Asia designated as terrorist
Terrorism in Bangladesh
Rohingya conflict
Jihadist groups in Bangladesh
Organizations designated as terrorist by the United States
Organisations designated as terrorist by the United Kingdom
Organisations designated as terrorist by New Zealand